Richard Evans is an American physician and politician from Maine. Evans, a Democrat, has served in the Maine House of Representatives since 2020. He is a surgeon at Northern Light Mayo Hospital in Dover-Foxcroft, Maine. He is African-American and became the first Democrat to represent the overwhelmingly white district in 30 years. He serves as a member on the Joint Committee on Health Coverage, Insurance and Financial Services.

Growing up in a poor part of Houston, Texas, Evans earned a Bachelor of Science in Microbiology and Chemistry from Howard University and a Doctorate of Medicine from Thomas Jefferson University's Jefferson Medical College.

References

Year of birth missing (living people)
Living people
Democratic Party members of the Maine House of Representatives
Politicians from Houston
People from Dover-Foxcroft, Maine
Howard University alumni
Jefferson Medical College alumni
21st-century African-American politicians
African-American state legislators in Maine
21st-century American politicians
20th-century African-American physicians
20th-century American physicians
21st-century African-American physicians
21st-century American physicians
20th-century surgeons
21st-century surgeons